"Manifest Destiny" is the fifth episode of the American crime comedy-drama television series Terriers. The episode was written by Leslye Headland, and directed by Rian Johnson. It was first broadcast on FX in the United States on October 6, 2010.

The series is set in Ocean Beach, San Diego and focuses on ex-cop and recovering alcoholic Hank Dolworth (Donal Logue) and his best friend, former criminal Britt Pollack (Michael Raymond-James), who both decide to open an unlicensed private investigation business. In the episode, Hank and Britt try to get rid of the problem with Lindus' corpse, while also investigating a law firm that seems to be involved with him.

According to Nielsen Media Research, the episode was seen by an estimated 0.486 million household viewers and gained a 0.2/1 ratings share among adults aged 18–49. The episode received extremely positive reviews from critics, who praised the resolution to some of the story arcs, performances and directing.

Plot
As Lindus (Christopher Cousins) is reported to have gone missing, Josephine (Jackie Debatin) accuses Hank (Donal Logue) and Britt (Michael Raymond-James) of having kidnapped him. Mark (Rockmond Dunbar) questions Hank, who suggests he may have had access to his vault, but he can't be arrested as he never confessed anything.

Returning home, they see that Steph (Karina Logue) has placed Lindus' corpse in a bathtub with ice. They take the body out of the house, retrieve one of Lindus' cars from his mansion, and stage his death to look like a drunk driving incident. The next day, they visit Josephine, claiming that retrieving Lindus from the airfield was part of a plan that Lindus asked them to do. Josephine then informs them that Lindus' associates wanted to meet with him and she provided them with Hank's and Britt's contact numbers and address. Hank takes Steph to live with Gretchen (Kimberly Quinn) while Britt also moves out of their house with Katie (Laura Allen).

To lure the associates, Hank and Britt use Lindus' frozen credit card to put fake trails, making it appear like he stayed in a motel room. Later, a man (Daren Scott), whom Hank identifies as the person who forced Mickey to use drugs, visits the motel room and leaves. They follow him to a law firm, Zeitlin & Associates. As Hank follows the man, he is approached by Ben Zeitlin (Michael Gaston), who wants to represent him and Britt on the accusation of kidnapping Lindus, to which Hank gives some details on his role. Zeitlin also wants to know a soil study that Lindus apparently possessed, threatening them by showing that the company and the man, identified as Mr. Burke, have been following them for days. On his way out, Hank punches Mr. Burke in the nose.

Hank and Britt visit Maggie (Jamie Denbo), who just gave birth to her son. Realizing that Zeitlin is involved, she tells them to give them everything they want and then leave. To complicate matters, Gretchen and Jason (Loren Dean) have checked the soil report, which reveals that the chemicals used on the ground would be carcinogenic to the people. Hank decides to change plans and intervene into the development deals. He and Britt locate Lindus' car and insert the soil report on Lindus' jacket. They later report the car incident, so the police will discover the car, the body and the soil report.

As Hank and Britt watch the news coverage on a bar, they are joined by Mark. Mark wonders if they had a role in Lindus' death, to which they deny. While Mark may not know what they did, he is actually thankful for whatever they did. The next day, Zeitlin is forced to give a conference to condemn the soil report, which will halt the development plan. Hank thanks Jason and Gretchen for helping him with Steph. As they leave, Hank tells Gretchen that he still loves her. While driving home, Steph states that the soil report had false numbers, as if people wanted it to appear carcinogenic. Hank then drives to the development site, where he sees Mr. Burke supervising workers joining the project. As Gretchen questions if the case remains open, Hank doubtfully says that it is closed.

Reception

Viewers
The episode was watched by 0.486 million viewers, earning a 0.2/1 in the 18-49 rating demographics on the Nielson ratings scale. This means that 0.2 percent of all households with televisions watched the episode, while 1 percent of all households watching television at that time watched it. This was a 26% decrease in viewership from the previous episode, which was watched by 0.649 million viewers with a 0.3/1 in the 18-49 rating demographics.

Critical reviews
"Manifest Destiny" received extremely positive reviews from critics. Noel Murray of The A.V. Club gave the episode a "B+" grade and wrote, "Waiting to see how Hank would get pulled back in added a layer of tension to an episode that was a fraction less grabby than the previous four Terriers. 'Manifest Destiny' was every bit as clever and funny as what we've seen so far — with a little stylistic flourish provided by director Rian Johnson — but with no new case for our heroes to investigate, there was more of a businesslike feel to the episode. Dice to roll. Cards to play. Pieces to move."

Alan Sepinwall of HitFix wrote, "'Manifest Destiny' wraps up the Lindus/Montague story arc for now, but in a way that makes it clear Britt and Hank will be wading through this particular septic tank again before the season's end. The hour, written by Lesley Headland and directed by Rian Johnson, kept up the chaotic feeling of the closing minutes of last week's episode."

Matt Richenthal of TV Fanatic gave the episode a 4.2 star rating out of 5 and wrote, "I sincerely have no idea what will happen next with this storyline, which is always a great feeling to have when watching any show. But it's an especially great feeling to have for a show that started out as a simple look at the lives of two close friends, and has evolved into an intricate world of murder, cover-ups and so much more." Cory Barker of TV Overmind wrote, "In 'Manifest Destiny', they have to deal with the consequences of that decision while the whole world starts to suck in around them. That element is probably one of my favorite parts of Terriers."

References

External links
 

2010 American television episodes
Terriers episodes
Television episodes directed by Rian Johnson